Herbert Edwards may refer to:
Herbert Edwards (cricketer, born 1884) (1884–1946), English cricketer

See also
Ringer Edwards (1913–2000), born "Herbert James Edwards", Australian prisoner of war
Bert Edwards (disambiguation)